The Neste is a river in southern France, a left tributary of the Garonne. It rises from several sources around Saint-Lary-Soulan, central Pyrenees and flows through
the following departments and towns:

 Hautes-Pyrénées: Saint-Lary-Soulan, Arreau, La Barthe-de-Neste
 Haute-Garonne: Montréjeau

Two rivers, the Neste d'Aure and the Neste du Louron, join to form the Neste at Arreau. The Neste flows into the Garonne in Montréjeau.

References

Rivers of France
Rivers of Occitania (administrative region)
Rivers of Hautes-Pyrénées
Rivers of Haute-Garonne